Karen Berger (born February 26, 1958) is an American comic book editor.  She is best known for her role in helping create DC Comics' Vertigo imprint in 1993 and serving as the line's Executive Editor until 2013. She currently oversees Berger Books, an imprint of creator-owned comics being published by Dark Horse Comics.

Biography 
Berger majored in English literature and art history at Brooklyn College, and upon her graduation in 1979, she entered the comics profession as an assistant to editor Paul Levitz at DC.  She later became Levitz's editor when he was writing Legion of Super-Heroes.  More interested in horror comics, she soon became editor of House of Mystery, and was instrumental in nurturing Alan Moore's Swamp Thing book, taking over the editing from co-creator Len Wein. She also edited Amethyst, Princess of Gemworld. She later helped bring Neil Gaiman's work to a mass audience by having him write The Sandman.

The success of these titles, and her willingness to help the writers who worked with her push the envelope of what could be done in mass-circulation comic books, led to the creation of the mature-reader Vertigo line in 1993.  Her critically and popularly successful titles under that imprint include Fables, Hellblazer, The Invisibles, 100 Bullets, Preacher, V for Vendetta, and Y: The Last Man.

Berger is married to Richard Bruning, who also formerly worked at DC.

In 2007, Berger was named supervising editor (along with Senior Editor Shelly Bond) of Minx, a new comic book imprint published by DC.  Minx published comics and graphic novels aimed at teenage girls until they were cancelled in 2008.

On December 3, 2012, she announced that she would be stepping down from her post as Executive Editor & Senior Vice President of DC Entertainment’s Vertigo imprint and that she would remain on through March 2013 to assist in the transition to a new editorial team.

The New York Times profiled Berger and her departure from Vertigo in an article entitled "Comics' Mother of 'The Weird Stuff' is Moving On".

In February 2017, Dark Horse Comics announced that Karen Berger would be overseeing a new line of creator-owned comics published by Dark Horse under the imprint: Berger Books.

Berger Books' first print publication was Berger Books Free 2018 Preview dated November 2017.  Berger Books first full comic was Hungry Ghosts #1, (written by Anthony Bourdain and Joel Rose) on sale in comic book shops on January 31, 2018.

As of February 2019, Berger Books publishes several titles including Incognegro (10th anniversary edition) and a prequel Incognegro: Renaissance (2018 February) both written by Mat Johnson, Mata Hari written by Emma Beeby (2018 Feb-Sept), She Could Fly written by Christopher Cantwell (2018 July) (with a sequel starting in 2019 April),  The Seeds written by Ann Nocenti (2018 August), and Olivia Twist written by Darin Strauss (award-winning writer) and Adam Dalva (2018 Sept-2019), and LaGuardia written by Hugo Award winner Nnedi Okorafor (2018 December).

Awards 
Berger won the Inkpot Award in 1990, three Eisner Awards (1992, 1994 and 1995), and the Comics Buyer's Guide Award for Favorite Editor every year from 1997 through 2005.

See also 
 List of women in comics
 List of American comics creators

References

External links 
 Sequential Tart (Feb. 2001): Interview
 
 
 Berger Books at the Dark Horse website
 

Comic book editors
Vertigo Comics
Living people
Place of birth missing (living people)
1958 births
Brooklyn College alumni
DC Comics people
Inkpot Award winners